R38 is a class of British airships, of which only one was completed.

R38 may also refer to:
 R-38 (missile), a Soviet prototype air-to-air missile
 R38 (New York City Subway car)
 R38 (South Africa), a road
 , a submarine of the Royal Navy
 , an aircraft carrier of the Royal Navy
 R38: Irritating to skin, a risk phrase
 Renard R.38, a Belgian aircraft
 Small nucleolar RNA R38
 Tachikawa R-38, a Japanese training aircraft
 R38, a car design of London Underground R Stock trains